The medial brachial cutaneous nerve (lesser internal cutaneous nerve; medial cutaneous nerve of arm) is a sensory branch of the medial cord of the brachial plexus derived from spinal nerves C8-T1. It provides sensory innervation to the medial arm. It descends accompanied by the basilic vein.

Anatomy

Origin 
It is the smallest and medial-most branch of the brachial plexus, and arising from the medial cord receives its fibers from the eighth cervical and first thoracic spinal nerves.

Course 
It passes through the axilla, at first lying behind, and then medial to the axillary vein, and communicates with the intercostobrachial nerve.

It descends along the medial side of the brachial artery to the middle of the arm, where it pierces the deep fascia, and is distributed to the skin of the back of the lower third of the arm, extending as far as the elbow, where some filaments are lost in the skin in front of the medial epicondyle, and others over the olecranon.

It communicates with the ulnar branch of the medial antebrachial cutaneous nerve.

Eponym
The term nerve of Wrisberg (after Heinrich August Wrisberg) has been used to describe this nerve.

However, the term "nerve of Wrisberg" can also refer to the nervus intermedius branch of the facial nerve.

See also
 Superior lateral cutaneous nerve of arm
 Inferior lateral cutaneous nerve of arm
 Posterior cutaneous nerve of arm

References

Additional images

External links
 
 
 

Nerves of the upper limb